Augusta is a village in southeast Hancock County, Illinois, United States. The population was 587 at the 2010 census, down from 657 at the 2000 census. It is located near Weinberg-King State Park.

Geography 
Augusta is located in southeastern Hancock County at  (40.230946, -90.950741).

History 

Augusta was founded in 1832 by Joel Catlin and W.D. Abernathy, who was the village's first postmaster. Catlin named Augusta after having a memorable visit to Augusta, Georgia.

On September 18, 1858, soon-to-be President Abraham Lincoln visited Augusta, where he gave a speech and stayed at the home of Elder James Stark. Previously, Lincoln's opponent in the historic Lincoln–Douglas debates, Stephen A. Douglas, had spoken in Augusta. In 1864, Congressman James Garfield (the future president) spoke in Augusta on behalf of Lincoln. Other notable visitors include William McKinley and Theodore Roosevelt in the fall of 1900. Only Roosevelt gave a short speech on his trip through Augusta during the campaign.

Events 
Every year in July, Augusta plays host to the Hancock County Fair.

Education 
Southeastern High School is located in Augusta.

Demographics 

As of the census of 2000, there were 657 people, 296 households, and 179 families residing in the village. The racial makeup of the village was 99.70% White, and 0.30% from two or more races. Hispanic or Latino of any race were 0.76% of the population.

There were 296 households, out of which 23.0% had children under the age of 18 living with them, 50.3% were married couples living together, 8.1% had a female householder with no husband present, and 39.2% were non-families. 34.5% of all households were made up of individuals, and 20.6% had someone living alone who was 65 years of age or older.  The average household size was 2.22 and the average family size was 2.84.

In the village, the population was spread out, with 19.6% under the age of 18, 7.9% from 18 to 24, 25.3% from 25 to 44, 24.5% from 45 to 64, and 22.7% who were 65 years of age or older.  The median age was 43 years. For every 100 females, there were 87.2 males.  For every 100 females age 18 and over, there were 87.2 males.

The median income for a household in the village was $29,167, and the median income for a family was $37,813. Males had a median income of $24,926 versus $17,639 for females. The per capita income for the village was $15,237.  About 5.9% of families and 9.7% of the population were below the poverty line, including 13.3% of those under age 18 and 10.6% of those age 65 or over.

References 

Villages in Hancock County, Illinois
Villages in Illinois
Populated places established in 1832
1832 establishments in Illinois